L'Orient-Le Jour is a leading French-language daily newspaper in Lebanon.

History
L'Orient-Le Jour was first published on 15 June 1971, following the merger of two French language Lebanese dailies, L'Orient (founded in Beirut in 1924 by Gabriel Khabbaz and Georges Naccache) and Le Jour (founded in 1934 by Michel Chiha).

Between 1970 and 1975 one of the contributors was Samir Frangieh. During the Lebanese Civil War the paper was closed down by the occupying Syrian Army for a brief period in 1976 but the paper resumed publication after. The editor-in-chief of L'Orient-Le Jour, Eduard Saab, was murdered on 16 May 1976.

The paper covers politics, local and international news, finance and economics, culture, entertainment as well as sports. According to the Arab Press Network, an offshoot of the World Association of Newspapers and News Publishers (WAN-IFRA), it is the only extant Francophone newspaper in Lebanon and is "partisan to a liberal, Christian leaning line."

The paper is published by Société de presse et d'éditions SAL, that also published the business magazine Le Commerce du Levant.

Ownership
The main shareholders of L'Orient-Le Jour are former minister Michel Eddé and his grandchildren (38 percent), the Choueiri group (22.7 percent) and the family of the former minister Michel Pharaon (15.49 percent). The latter's shares are distributed as follows: Pharaon directly holds 2.6 percent of the shares, his sister, Nayla De Freige, holds 1.7 percent, the Pharaon Holding SAL has 11 percent and Libano-Suisse Insurance Consulting has 0.2 percent. Not all shareholders have been made publicly available, which represent 23.8% of the ownership.

See also
French language in Lebanon

References

External links

   
   

1971 establishments in Lebanon
French-language newspapers published in Lebanon
Newspapers published in Beirut
Newspapers established in 1971
Daily newspapers published in Lebanon